Charlie Van Der Bist (15 June 1915 – 6 May 1970) was an  Australian rules footballer who played with Hawthorn in the Victorian Football League (VFL).

Originally from Rochester, he played with Mordialloc in 1938, winning the Frankston (Federal) Football League best and fairest award, before playing with Hawthorn in 1939 and 1940.

In 1939, Van Der Bist was hit by Ron Barassi Senior in a match against Melbourne. Barassi later received a four-week suspension.

Van Der Bist won the 1951 Central Gippsland Football League goal kicking award with 67 goals, playing for Warragul Football Club.

In 1933, Van Der Bist was shot in the face with a shot gun when out shooting hares.

Van Der Bist represented the Echuca Cricket Association at Melbourne Country Week in 1937.

Van Der Bist was enlisted in the Australian Army at Geraldton, Western Australia.

Notes

External links 

1940 - Hawthorn FC - team photo

1915 births
1970 deaths
Australian rules footballers from Victoria (Australia)
Hawthorn Football Club players
Australian Army personnel of World War II